Fabrizio Casanova (born 19 January 1957) is a retired Swiss football defender.

References

1957 births
Living people
Swiss men's footballers
FC Lugano players
Swiss Super League players
Association football defenders
20th-century Swiss people
Place of birth missing (living people)